'Beach Party is an extended play by Australian pop-rock group Uncanny X-Men. 'Beach Party was released in August 1984 and peaked at No. 32 in Australia. The song "Everybody Wants to Work" was played on radio to promote the EP.

Track listing

Charts

References 

1984 EPs
Uncanny X-Men (band) albums
Mushroom Records albums
EPs by Australian artists